Typhoon Fitow, known in the Philippines as Typhoon Quedan, was the strongest typhoon to make landfall in Mainland China during October since 1949. The 21st named storm of the 2013 Pacific typhoon season, Fitow developed on September 29 to the east of the Philippines. It initially tracked north-northwestward, gradually intensifying into a tropical storm and later to typhoon status, or with winds of at least . The next day, the typhoon struck China at Fuding in Fujian province. Fitow quickly weakened over land, dissipating on October 7.

Across its path, Fitow spurred many airlines to cancel flights and caused other transport disruptions. In Japan, the typhoon damaged 1,464 houses and left about 6,800 households without power on Miyako-jima. Heavy rainfall in Taiwan flooded houses and caused mudslides that closed two highways. Damage was heaviest in Fujian and Zhejiang provinces in China near where Fitow struck. Across China, Fitow damaged about 95,000 houses and left at least 159,000 other houses without power. The damage in the country reached ¥63.14 billion (2013 RMB, $10.3 billion USD), of which ¥6 billion (RMB, US$1 billion) was from insured losses, totaling up to ¥69.14 billion (RMB, $10.4 billion in 2013 USD), making it the costliest event on record. There were also 12 deaths in China, eight of them related to electrocutions.

Meteorological history

At the time, wind shear dislocated the convection to the west of a broad and poorly-defined circulation. Although the system was poorly organized, tropical cyclone forecast models noted the potential for development to occur. The convection gradually consolidated and outflow increased to the west, indicative of increased organization. Around the same time, the Philippine Atmospheric, Geophysical and Astronomical Services Administration (PAGASA) also began issuing warnings on the depression, giving it the local name Quedan. Early on September 30, the Joint Typhoon Warning Center (JTWC) initiated advisories on Tropical Depression 22W, noting that the circulation had become increasingly well-defined amid decreasing wind shear.

With a ridge to the east, the system tracked to the north-northwest through an area of warm water temperatures. At 1200 UTC on September 30, the JMA upgraded the depression to Tropical Storm Fitow. Although outflow and convection increased in general, the thunderstorm activity diminished over the center due to sinking air. By late on October 1, however, convection increased over Fitow's center, and the next day the JMA upgraded it to a severe tropical storm. On October 2, an eye began developing on satellite imagery, although the rainbands wrapping into the eye were fragmented. By that time, the convection had increased in coverage and intensity, with outflow increased by a trough to the north. The JMA did not follow suit until 1200 UTC on October 4, by which time the eye had become better defined.

After officially becoming a typhoon, Fitow turned more to the northwest due to the ridge building to the east. Despite increasing wind shear, the typhoon continued to intensify due to amplified outflow. Also on October 5, PAGASA issued the final advisory as the storm exited the agency's area of responsibility. As the typhoon passed northeast of Taiwan, the ragged eye became cloud-filled and the convection weakened. Late on October 6, Fitow made landfall just south of Wenzhou in eastern China, at Fuding in Fujian province. While continuing northwestward near the border of Zhejiang and Fujian provinces, Fitow rapidly weakened, dissipating on October 7.

Preparations

On the Japanese island of Okinawa, 288 flights at Naha Airport were canceled, affecting 28,000 people. Officials also canceled bus, monorail, and ferry services. In South Korea, workers involved with the 2013 Formula One season issued a typhoon alert and began planning contingencies in the event Fitow affected the Korean Grand Prix. Officials in Taiwan issued a storm warning before Fitow passed north of the island. The Taiwan military activated 20,000 troops to protect and be on standby. Seventeen ferry services between Taiwan and the offshore islands were terminated, and over 200 flights were canceled. Schools and government offices closed in portions of Taiwan due to the storm.

Ahead of the storm, officials in China issued warnings for Zhejiang and Fujian for the potential of high winds and flooding, which was later credited for reducing casualties. The Chinese army was utilized to assist in militating against potential flooding. Officials told boat owners to put their property in shelter, totaling 65,000 vessels ordered to return to report. Coastal facilities such as seaside bathing centers were closed. Before Fitow struck China, 177,000 people evacuated in Fujian and a further 574,000 evacuated their houses in Zhejiang, totaling 751,000 people. In Shanghai, 42 train or bus rides were canceled, along with 40 canceled flights. Two airports in Zhejiang had 49 canceled flights, with another 20 canceled in Fujian.

Impact

In Okinawa, the typhoon caused power outages, disrupted transportation, and damaged farms. In Japan, Fitow damaged 1,464 homes and injured five people.

While passing north of Taiwan, Fitow dropped heavy rainfall reaching  at a station in Hsinchu County. In the county, the rains forced 224 people to evacuate their houses. Mudslides and the threat for flooding spurred officials to close portions of two provincial highways. The typhoon also produced strong winds that caused power outages for 6,900 people.

China
Throughout eastern China, the high winds and rains knocked down trees and ruined local shrimp and seaweed farms, and overall  of crops were flooded, including  in Wenzhou. Widespread areas were flooded, forcing residents to travel by boats. Fitow damaged or destroyed about 95,000 houses. The typhoon killed 12 people in the country, and left ¥63.1 billion in damage (2013 RMB, $10.4 billion USD). Insured losses from Fitow totaled ¥6 billion (RMB, US$1 billion), the second costliest event on record for China.

The typhoon spread heavy rainfall across eastern China in the Jiangnan region, in conjunction with a plume of cold air. A station in Shanghai reported , the highest daily rainfall total since 1961.

Across eastern China, Fitow left heavy damage due to strong winds, heavy rainfall, and a powerful storm surge. Floodwaters covered about 70% of the metropolis of Yuyao, reaching  in some areas, which cut off power and water supply. The floods were the worst in a century for the city, covering most roadways, and forcing most schools, health facilities, and factories to close. In the city, about 100,000 people were forced to evacuate, with 289 temporary shelters opened. Damage in the city alone totaled about ¥20 billion (RMB, US$3.27 billion). In Ningbo in eastern Zhejiang, Fitow wrecked 26,180 houses and damaged local fish farms, killing 51,000 tons of fish. The storm forced 18,134 factories to shut down, and there were also power and telecommunication outages.

In Shanghai, high waters along the Huangpu River damaged a portion of a flood prevention wall. Rainfall caused several matches to be canceled at the 2013 Shanghai Masters. Flooding closed the city zoo and 60 parks, and entered 600 houses. In Cangnan County in Wenzhou, Fitow wrecked 1,200 houses, and throughout Wenzhou, two people died – one after being blown off a hill, and the other trapped under collapsed rubble. High winds left 254,746 people in Zhejiang without power, and eight people died in the province from electrocutions. Another two people died after driving into a flooded river. Throughout China, Fitow damaged or destroyed 95,000 houses.

Aftermath
In Zhejiang, about 10,000 utility men worked to restore the widespread power outages. In the days following the storm, about 1.24 million people were forced to stay in shelters due to damage. A total of 11,732 soldiers or militia members assisted in helping in the storm's aftermath. Many cleared mudslides from roads, repaired dams, and helped people leave flooded homes. In Tongxiang in Zhejiang province, thousands of people blocked a highway in protest for not receiving aid, prompting the riot police to break up the gathering. The town did not receive supplies other than water tanks, due to it being designated a "self-rescuing area" according to a local official. Ping An Insurance received insurance claims for 11,348 flooded cars in the days after the storm. The storm caused slight delays to shipping in Ningbo and Shanghai. The Chinese Ministry of Finance and Civil Affairs allocated ¥118 million (US$19.3 million) in funding for Zhejiang and Fujian provinces after the storm.

In general, local governments assisted the affected storm victims by providing food, water, and clothing, even traveling by canoe to distribute aid. However, residents in Yuyao complained about insufficient assistance, as many people were without food or clean water for several days, due to ongoing flooding making distribution difficult. This sparked thousands of people to protest the government, although they dispersed after increased numbers of policemen. Residents were initially required to show food coupons to receive meals, but later anyone with a residence permit could receive the meals; however, the food distribution was disorganized, and there were reports of people looting for food. By October 18, the flooding in Yuyao had subsided and roadways had reopened, and power service was gradually restored. Due to the extended disruptions to the city, garbage service was halted. Two people in Yuyao were arrested after spreading false rumors online that reservoir collapsed during the storm, killing 40 people.

Retirement
During their 2014 annual session, the ESCAP/WMO Typhoon Committee announced that the name Fitow would be retired from the naming lists. The name Mun was chosen to replace Fitow.

See also

Typhoon Rananim
Tropical Storm Bilis
Typhoon Matsa

Notes

References

External links

JMA General Information of Typhoon Fitow (1323) from Digital Typhoon
JMA Best Track Data of Typhoon Fitow (1323) 
JTWC Best Track Data of Typhoon 22W (Fitow)
22W.FITOW from the U.S. Naval Research Laboratory

2013 Pacific typhoon season
Typhoons in China
Typhoons in Japan
Typhoons in Taiwan
Retired Pacific typhoons
Typhoons
Fitow